Béla Simon (born 4 August 1988) is a Hungarian rower. He competed at the 2012 Summer Olympics in London in the Men's Pair event together with his teammate Domonkos Széll. They were eliminated in the repechage round.

He competed in the same event at the 2016 Summer Olympics with Adrián Juhász, reaching the B final.  The pair won the event at the 2016 European Championships.  The pair also won the silver medal at the 2009 World Under 23 Championships.

References

External links
 
 
 

1988 births
Living people
Hungarian male rowers
Olympic rowers of Hungary
Rowers at the 2012 Summer Olympics
Rowers at the 2016 Summer Olympics
World Rowing Championships medalists for Hungary
People from Szolnok
Sportspeople from Jász-Nagykun-Szolnok County